Austen Stowell Cargill (April 8, 1888 – May 24, 1957) was an American businessman. He was the son of William Wallace Cargill, the founder of Cargill, the largest privately held company in the United States.

Early life
Austen Cargill was the fourth and youngest child of William Wallace Cargill and Ellen ("Ella") Theresa Stowell. On his father's death, he inherited one-third of Cargill.

Career
At the time of his death, he was president of Cargill. He was succeeded by Cargill MacMillan Sr, the eldest son of his sister Edna.

Personal life
He married Anne Ray, and they had two children:
Margaret Anne Cargill (1920–2006)
James R. Cargill (1923–2006)

Later life
Cargill died suddenly in California at the age of 69.

References

1888 births
1957 deaths
People from La Crosse, Wisconsin
American business executives
Austen Stowell